Kuehneromyces is a genus of agaric fungi in the family Strophariaceae. The genus was circumscribed by mycologists Rolf Singer and Alexander H. Smith in 1946.

The genus name of Kuehneromyces is in honour of Robert Kühner (1903-1996), who was a French mycologist most notable for reviewing many agaric.

See also

List of Agaricales genera

References

Bolbitiaceae
Agaricales genera
Taxa named by Alexander H. Smith
Taxa named by Rolf Singer
Taxa described in 1946